T. striatum may refer to:
 Toxicodendron striatum, a South American tree species
 Trifolium striatum, the knotted clover, a plant species